The Roman Catholic Diocese of Minna is a diocese located in the city of Minna in the Ecclesiastical province of Kaduna in Nigeria.

History
 November 9, 1964: Established as Apostolic Prefecture of Minna from Metropolitan Archdiocese of Kaduna
 September 17, 1973: Promoted as Diocese of Minna

Special churches
The Cathedral is St. Michael's Cathedral in Minna.

Leadership
 Prefects Apostolic of Minna (Roman rite) 
 Father Edmund Joseph Fitzgibbon, S.P.S. (1964.11.25 – 1973.09.17), resigned; future Bishop
 Bishops of Minna (Roman rite)
 Bishop Christopher Shaman Abba (1973.09.17 – 1996.07.05), appointed Bishop of Yola
 Bishop Martin Igwe Uzoukwu (since 1996.07.05)

See also
Roman Catholicism in Nigeria

External links
 GCatholic.org Information
 Catholic Hierarchy
Nigerian Catholic Diocesan Priests Association page about Minna Diocese 

Minna
Christian organizations established in 1964
Roman Catholic dioceses and prelatures established in the 20th century
Roman Catholic Ecclesiastical Province of Kaduna